Mambo Nassau is the second studio album by French singer Lizzy Mercier Descloux. It was released on ZE Records in 1981 and recorded at the Compass Point Studios in Nassau, Bahamas.

Album review
"After Mambo Nassau in 1982, Lizzy wanted to go to South Africa and record with musicians from Soweto. South Africa was still under apartheid, so in order to persuade the record company, Lizzy recorded in Paris a couple of songs inspired by South African music. "Mister Soweto", "Maita", and "Les Baisers d’Amants" came from these sessions, which included orphan songs, griots' ballads, African roller coaster produced by Adam Kidron (who just had produced Rip Rig + Panic and Scritti Politti) with guests Krootchey on vocals and Mike Mc Voy as a white master rabbit, Green Gartside (Scritti Politti) & Aswad drummer OEs Drummie Zeb.

"Bob Marley’s cover « Sun is Shining » was recorded in 1995 at Massachusetts’s Bear Den studio with Greg Jiritano, John Schumann, and Michel Bassignani: Kusturica dub in mind.

"Corpo Molli, Pao Duro" was recorded in NY with Arto Lindsay and Krootchey back in 1980 and developed in August 2003 with Charlus De Lasalle, orgy of the percussive mouth, Brazilian meet Klezmer and have a ball. Sorry no Barbie Doll!

"All these songs have a Massai walk, white trash shadow, a samourai heart and the smile of King Kong. AND•JOY. EXPLOSION. Kimbe Raid..."

Track listing
All songs written by Lizzy Mercier Descloux unless otherwise noted.

Personnel

Sound
The original sound recording was made by Michel Esteban in 1980, 1982, 2003 and by Lizzy Mercier Descloux in 1995
It was selected by Lizzy Mercier Descloux and Michel Esteban
Produced by Michel Esteban P & © ZE records 2003 Original analogue master tapes digitally transferred at 24 bits resolution by Studios: Source & Translab, Paris.
It was mastered to 16 bits for CD by Charlus de La Salle at South Factory Studio.
The executive producer by Michel Esteban.

Tracks 1 to 10

Produced by Lizzy Mercier Descloux and Steve Stanley
Recorded at Compass Point Studios, Nassau Bahamas, 1980

 Lizzy Mercier Descloux - vocals, guitars
 Yann Le ker - guitars
 Philippe Le Mongne - bass
 Bill Pery - drums
 Wally Badarou - synthesizers
 Gregory Zercinsky - percussions
Executive producer Michel Esteban

Tracks 11, 12,13 &16

Recorded by Dominique Blanc, Francard at Continental Studios, Paris 1982
Produced by Adam Kidron
Executive producer Michel Esteban

Track 14

Produced by Lizzy Mercier Descloux & Michel Bassignani
Recorded Chief Worm Studio, Massachusetts, 1995

Track 15

Produced by Lizzy Mercier Descloux & Michel Bassignani
Recorded NYC 1982, Overdubs & Mix by Charlus de la Salle at South Factory Studio 2003
Vocals Lizzy Mercier Descloux, Phillipe Krootchey & Arto Lindsay

Design
Art direction & Design by Michel Esteban
Photos Credits : Michel Esteban : Front cover, booklet pages 1,2,7,10,12,13,14,15.
Veronique G. page 5.
Art Lugh page 11,14 ( background) 16 & Central Digipack cover.

References

External links
 Liner Notes Album
 Billboard Review
 ArtistDirect Review

1981 albums
Lizzy Mercier Descloux albums
albums produced by Adam Kidron